Marie Jeanne Wright (1862 – 1 May 1949) was a British stage and film actress. She was born in Dover and died in Hendon.

Partial filmography

 God Bless Our Red, White and Blue (1918) - The Woman
 Quinneys (1919) - Mabel Dredge
 The Kinsman (1919) - Duchess
 Mrs. Thompson (1919) - Yates
 Testimony (1920) - Lizzie Emmett
 Paddy the Next Best Thing (1923) - Mary O'Hara
 The Sea Urchin (1926) - Mary Wynchbeck
 Unto Each Other (1929)
 Murder! (1930) - Miss Mitcham
 Tilly of Bloomsbury (1931) - Mrs. Banks
 Black Coffee (1931) - Miss Amory
 Up for the Cup (1931) - Mrs. Entwhistle
 Help Yourself (1931) - Sparrow
 A Lucky Sweep (1932) - Martha
 Naughty Cinderella (1933) - Mrs. Barrow
 This Acting Business (1933) - Mrs. Dooley
 Love's Old Sweet Song (1933) - Sarah
 A Cup of Kindness (1934) - Mrs. Mabel Ramsbottom
 City of Beautiful Nonsense (1935) - Dorothy Gray
 The Amazing Quest of Ernest Bliss (1936) - Mrs. Heath
 Hail and Farewell (1936) - Mrs. Perkins
 Victoria the Great (1937) - Old Kitty
 Silver Top (1938) - Mrs. Deeping
 Sexton Blake and the Hooded Terror (1938) - Mrs. Bardell
 Strange Boarders (1938) - Miss Toulson - Old Lady Who Gets Knocked Down (uncredited)
 Sixty Glorious Years (1938) - Maggie
 Black Eyes (1939) - Miss Brown
 Gaslight (1940) - Alice Barlow (final film role)

References

External links

1862 births
1949 deaths
English film actresses
English stage actresses
English silent film actresses
20th-century English actresses
Actresses from Kent
People from Dover, Kent